The Ice on Fire Tour was a worldwide concert tour held by English musician and composer Elton John, in support of his 19th studio album Ice on Fire. The tour included three legs (UK, Europe and North America) and a total of 122 shows.

Background
Elton had decided he wanted to hit the road with his new band, made up of some of the musicians who had worked with him on the Ice on Fire album in January, as well as a new set of backing singers: Alan Carvell, Helena Springs and Shirley Lewis – making it the largest band Elton had ever taken on tour.

On 14 November 1985, the tour began in Dublin and continued across the British Isles, including nine nights in a row at Wembley Arena, before concluding on 11 January 1986, in Belfast, Northern Ireland. As usual, Elton would select a handful of songs from his most recent album for inclusion in the set; in this instance, "Shoot Down The Moon", "This Town" and the singles "Nikita" and "Wrap Her Up" — all from Ice on Fire. The tour would continue in three months' time, but with a different percussionist.

Percussionist Jody Linscott replaced Ray Cooper on this second leg of the 1985-1986 World Tour, which began at the Palacio de Deportes de la Comunidad de Madrid on 1 March and continued through Europe before concluding on 26 April at the Vorst Nationaal in Brussels, Belgium.

After a four-month a break, during which Elton and the band recorded the Leather Jackets album, the North American leg of the world tour began at the Pine Knob Music Theatre in Clarkston, Michigan on 17 August and ended on 15 October with eight nights at Los Angeles' Universal Amphitheatre. One unique aspect to this tour was that Elton played acoustic guitar on stage (on Lesley Duncan's Love Song), something he had not done since 1976.

This part of the tour proved especially difficult for Elton, who unknowingly had developed potentially cancerous nodules on his vocal cords, and by the time he played his four-night run in New York City in mid-September, he was having a great deal of difficulty singing. Elton was ordered by his doctor not to speak while off-stage, and there was serious doubt as to whether or not he could finish this segment of the tour, let alone pull off the upcoming symphonic tour of Australia.

Setlists

1985

1986

Tour dates

Box office score data

Tour band
Elton John – lead vocals, piano, acoustic guitar on "Love Song"
Davey Johnstone – lead guitar, backing vocals
David Paton – bass guitar
Fred Mandel – keyboards, rhythm guitar
Charlie Morgan – drums
Ray Cooper – percussion (UK leg)
Jody Linscott – percussion (Europe and North American legs)
Alan Carvell – backing vocals
Helena Springs – backing vocals
Shirley Lewis – backing vocals
Onward International Horn Section

References

External links

 Information Site with Tour Dates

Elton John concert tours
1985 concert tours
1986 concert tours